Kenneth Smyth may refer to:

Ken Smyth, Australian politician
Lieutenant-Colonel Kenneth Smyth of 4th Parachute Brigade (United Kingdom)
Kenneth Smyth, killed in The Troubles in Strabane

See also
Kenneth Smith (disambiguation)